Piazza Santa Maria Novella is a city square in Florence, Italy.

Buildings around the square
Basilica of Santa Maria Novella
Museo Nazionale Alinari della Fotografia

Gallery

Maria